In first-order arithmetic, the induction principles, bounding principles, and least number principles are three related families of first-order principles, which may or may not hold in nonstandard models of arithmetic. These principles are often used in reverse mathematics to calibrate the axiomatic strength of theorems.

Definitions

For a formula  in two free variables, the bounding principle for  states that, for a fixed bound , if for every  there is  such that , then we can find a bound on the 's.

 

There is a similar strong induction principle for :

 

 

 

More commonly, we consider these principles not just for a single formula, but for a class of formulae in the arithmetical hierarchy.

Nonstandard models

However, they become more relevant in nonstandard models. Recall that a nonstandard model of arithmetic has the form  for some linear order .

For example, the hypothesis of the induction principle  only ensures that  holds for all elements in the standard part of  - it may not hold for the nonstandard elements, who can't be reached by iterating the successor operation from zero.

Relations between the principles

The following relations hold between the principles (over the weak base theory ):

  for every formula ;
 ;
 , and both implications are strict;
 ;
 , but it is not known if this reverses.

Over , Slaman proved that .

Reverse mathematics

The induction, bounding and least number principles are commonly used in reverse mathematics and second-order arithmetic. For example,  is part of the definition of the subsystem  of second-order arithmetic.

References

Formal theories of arithmetic
Mathematical axioms
Predicate logic